Bruce Jenner's World Class Decathlon is a 1996 sports video game.

Gameplay 
In the game, the player participates in a Decathlon.

Reception 

The game received unfavorable reviews. A reviewer for Next Generation said, "A decathlon simulation is a novel idea, but this implementation simply isn't exciting enough to do the job." GameSpots Hugo Foster made similar remarks, and added that the simplicity of the gameplay makes the results essentially arbitrary once the player has mastered the rudimentary skills involved, which removes any potential excitement from the multiplayer mode: "You find yourself begging for results, rather than feeling that you've done something to deserve them." However, he praised the included interview and commentaries from Jenner.

References

External links 
 

1996 video games
Cultural depictions of Caitlyn Jenner
Video games based on real people
Multiple-stage competition video games
North America-exclusive video games
Video games developed in the United States
Windows games
Windows-only games